Elections to Weymouth and Portland Borough Council in Dorset, England were held on 1 May 2008. One third of the council was up for election and the council stayed under no overall control as it has been since 1980.

The Mayor David Harris and four other councillors stood down at the election. A further seat was vacant for Melcombe Regis after the death of a Liberal Democrat councillor.

The election saw the Conservative Party gain 3 seats, including their first ever seat in Portland, consolidating their position as largest party on the council. However their leader Nigel Reed lost in Weymouth East to the Liberal Democrats. The leader of the Labour Party on the council, Kate Wheller, was one of two Labour losses when she lost in Westham West.

After the election, the composition of the council was:
Conservative 16
Liberal Democrat 12
Labour 4
Independent 4

Election result

Ward results

References

2008 Weymouth and Portland election result
Ward results

2008
2008 English local elections
2000s in Dorset